The WTA Bayonne was a WTA Tour affiliated women's tennis tournament held from 1989–1992 in Bayonne, France. It was also known as the Whirlpool Open, owing to its sponsor from 1991–1992.

During the event's first two years there was a total of US$100,000 on offer to players; during the final two years, when it was upgraded from a WTA Tier V to a WTA Tier IV event, the total prize fund was increased to $150,000. The inaugural event was held on indoor hard courts; the final three were held on indoor carpet.

Past results

Singles

Doubles

References
ITF search (Bayonne)

Carpet court tennis tournaments
Indoor tennis tournaments
Hard court tennis tournaments
Defunct tennis tournaments in France
WTA Tour
Bayonne